USS Perfecto (SP-86) was a motorboat that served in the United States Navy during World War I.  She was built in 1917 by the Greenport Basin and Construction Company in Greenport, New York, and owned by J. J. Phelps of Hackensack, New Jersey.  She was acquired by the Navy on 22 June 1917 and placed in service on 25 June 1917.  During World War I, Perfecto served in the 5th Naval District, headquartered in Norfolk Navy Yard in Norfolk, Virginia.  She patrolled the coastline for German U-boats.  She was returned to her owner, Phelps, after the war ended on 18 February 1919.

Sources
Section Patrol Craft Photo Archive: Perfecto (SP 86)
USS Perfecto (SP-86), 1917-1919
Perfecto SP-86

Patrol vessels of the United States Navy
World War I patrol vessels of the United States
Ships built in Greenport, New York
1917 ships